House of Montmirail is a family from the Middle Ages, originally from the village of Montmirail, in the County of Champagne, and was a vassal of the Count of Champagne.

Background 
The family of Montmirail is not well known but is old and dates back to the 11th century. Some 19th century historians say that this family would in fact originate from Île de France where a man named Gaucher, who had become the owner of estates in Brie, build a fort to which he gives his name : Le Fort de Gaucher or La Ferté-Gaucher. Neighbour of the properties of counts of Meaux, he befriends the count of that time, probably Theobald III of Troyes, and asks him to marry one of his daughters or granddaughters. The count accepted his proposal and gave him the land of Montmirail as a dowry.

Genealogy 
 Gaucher de La Ferté-Gaucher, semi-legendary character who would have been the first baron of Montmirail and La Ferté-Gaucher in the middle of the 11th century. He marries a daughter or a granddaughter of Thibaud 1st from Troyes, with whom he had at least one child:
 Dalmase de Montmirail, an heir.
 Dalmas de Montmirail or Dalmace de Montmirail, known as a first baron from Montmirail and La Ferté-Gaucher at the end of 11th century. It appears in a charter of the Bishops of Meaux Burchard in which he attests that Dalmas and his son Gaucher donate to the Abbey of St. Jean des Vignes, Soissons an oven and a tithe. He marries a woman named Agnès or Adélaïde, with whom he has at least one child:
 Gaucher de Montmirail, an heir.
 Gaucher de Montmirail († after 1128), baron of Montmirail and La Ferté-Gaucher after his father's death. He founded abbaye Saint-Jean-des-Vignes, Soissons and gave to the churches and priories of Saint-Étienne de Montmirail and Saint-Martin de La Ferté-Gaucher as well as the Molesme Abbey. He marries a woman named Élisabeth, with whom he has at least two children:
 Hélie de Montmirail, an heir.
 Gaucher de Montmirail or Gautier de Montmirail, monk in Clairvaux Abbey.
 Hélie de Montmirail († before 1145), baron of Montmirail and La Ferté-Gaucher after his father's death. He promotes the foundation of Notre-Dame-d'Andecy Abbey. He marries Adélaïde de Pleurs, daughter of Jean de Pleurs, baron of Pleurs and vicount of Mareuil, and lady of Arcis, and who married Anséric III de Montréal as a second marriage, with whom he had four children:
 Gaucher de Montmirail, probably the oldest. Cited in a single act. Died young.
 André de Montmirail, heir of the preceding.
 Hugues de Montmirail, probably a monk in Saint-Pierre de Preuilly
 Ade de Montmirail, who married Hugues de Saint-Florentin.
 André de Montmirail († about 1177), baron of Montmirail and La Ferté-Gaucher after his father's death. He marries Hildiarde d’Oisy, daughter of Simon d'Oisy, squire of Cambrai, and Ade de La Ferté-sous-Jouarre, vicount of Meaux, he had two children.
 Jean de Montmirail, an heir.
 Ade or Ada de Montmirail, who first married Clarembaud de Noyers, hence posterity. Widowed, she marries secondly with Vilain de Nully, hence posterity.
 Jean de Montmirail († 1217), baron of Montmirail and La Ferté-Gaucher after his father's death as well as Oisy, Crèvecœur, La Ferté-Ancoul, squire of Cambrai and vicount of Meaux after his mother's death. He was also a constable of France and will be beatified in about 1250. He marries Helvide de Dampierre, daughter of Guillaume 1st, baron of Dampierre, and Ermengarde de Toucy, he had six children:
 Guillaume de Montmirail, mentioned in 1203, probably died before his father without union or descendants.
 Jean II de Montmirail, heir of the preceding.
 Mathieu de Montmirail, heir of his brother.
 Élisabeth de Montmirail, monk in Mont-Dieu de Montmirail.
 Marie de Montmirail, heir of his brothers.
 Félicie de Montmirail, lady of La Ferté-Gaucher, who marries Hélie II de Wavrin, seneschal of Flandres, son of Robert de Wavrin and Sibylle de Flandre, hence posterity.
 Jean II de Montmirail († 1240), baron of Montmirail, Oisy, Crèvecœur, La Ferté-Ancoul, squire of Cambrai and vicount of Meaux after his father's death. He marries Isabelle de Blois, countess of Chartes, widowed Sulpice III d'Amboise, daughter Thibaut V de Blois and Alix de France, but no offspring.
 Mathieu de Montmirail († 1262), baron of Montmirail, Oisy, Crèvecœur, La Ferté-Ancoul, squire of Cambrai and vicount of Meaux after his brother's death. He marries firstly to a woman named Alise, and second to Isabelle de Villebéon known as La Chambellane, daughter of Adam Ist, baron of Villebéon and grand chamberlain of France, but no offspring.
 Marie de Montmirail († 1272), Lady of Montmirail, Oisy, Crèvecœur, La Ferté-Ancoul, squire of Cambrai and vicount of Meaux after his brother's death. She marries Enguerrand III de Coucy, baron of Coucy, of which she has several children to whom she will transmit all her titles.

Works in fiction 
The character of Godefroy de Montmirail from the cinematographic saga "Les Visiteurs" is totally fictitious and therefore cannot be related to this family.

See also
 County of Champagne
 Montmirail, Marne
 La Ferté-Gaucher

References

Sources 
 Marie Henry d'Arbois de Jubainville, Histoire des Ducs et Comtes de Champagne, 1865.
 Alexandre-Clément Boitel, Histoire du bienheureux Jean, surnommé l'Humble, 1859.

French noble families
House of Montmirail